Sword's Song is the second studio album released by the Finnish heavy metal band Battlelore, released in 2003. As with all of the band's other albums, the lyrics are based on J.R.R. Tolkien's Middle-earth sagas. Sword's Song's music and lyrics are essentially similar to those of their debut album, but in the opinion of most reviewers and fans showed an improvement in both strength of the material and quality of the performances.

The album was the last to feature original vocalist Patrik Mennander and bass player Miika Kokkola and, as a result, following releases saw a noticeable change in the sound of Battlelore.

Track listing
All music by Battlelore, all lyrics by Jyri Vahvanen.

Credits
Band members
Kaisa Jouhki - vocals
Patrik Mennander - vocals
Jussi Rautio - guitar
Jyri Vahvanen - guitar
Miika Kokkola - bass
Henri Vahvanen - drums
Maria Honkanen- keyboards

Production
Miitri Aaltonen - producer, engineer, mixing
Eric Zacharias - pre-production, additional synthesizer arrangements
Pauli Saastamoinen - mastering at Finnvox Studios

Lyrical references
 "Sons of Riddermark" deals with the history of the Éothéod.
 "The Mark of the Bear" is about the Beornings.
 "Buccaneers Inn" deals with the Black Númenóreans.
 "Attack of the Orcs" is about the Orken hordes in the Third Age.
 "Dragonslayer" is based on the story of Túrin Turambar.
 "Khazad-Dûm Pt. 2 (Silent Caverns)" deals with the invasion of Moria.
 "The War of Wrath" is based on the War of Wrath.
 "Forked Height" deals with the tower of Orthanc.
 "The Curse of the Kings" is about the Nazgûl.
 "Starlight Kingdom" is about the city of Gondolin.

References

External links
 Battlelore Official Homepage

Battlelore albums
2003 albums
Napalm Records albums